Diplotoxa is a genus of grass flies in the family Chloropidae. There are about 8 described species in Diplotoxa.

Species
 Diplotoxa alternata (Loew, 1872)
 Diplotoxa diplotoxoides (Becker, 1912)
 Diplotoxa inclinata Becker, 1912
 Diplotoxa messoria (Fallen, 1820)
 Diplotoxa nigripes (Coquillett, 1910)
 Diplotoxa recurva (Adams, 1903)
 Diplotoxa unicolor Becker, 1912
 Diplotoxa versicolor (Loew, 1863)

References

Further reading

External links

 Diptera.info

Chloropinae
Schizophora genera